The Tacen Whitewater Course is a venue for canoe and kayak slalom competition in Tacen, Slovenia, a suburb of Ljubljana. Located on the Sava River, eight kilometers northwest of the city center, it is known locally as Kayak Canoe Club Tacen. The course played an important role in development of the sport during the past six decades. In 1939, when its first competition was held, it was a natural rapid at the base of a dam in the Sava River. In 1990, after many upgrades, it was given a concrete channel and the features of a modern Olympic-style slalom course. The course now starts in the lake behind the dam, and the spillway is the first drop. Tacen hosts a major international competition almost every year, examples being the 1955, the 1991, and the 2010 Championships.

Venue

The engineered part of the course is only 170 meters long. To increase its length to 275 meters, the course is extended upstream into the lake behind the dam and downstream into the natural flow of the Sava River. The upstream extension means that each paddler must begin the race with an 8-second flat-water sprint and reach the top of the spillway at maximum speed. That plus the usual upstream gate at the bottom of the spillway make for a challenging start, unlike that of any other venue in the international competition circuit.

References

Videos

Kauzer Tacen World Cup 1 2011 final
K1 C1 C2 World Cup 1 2011 finals
Molmenti 2010 World Championship
Molmenti vs Kauzer - 2010 World Championship
The Hochschorners vs Gargaud/Lefevre - 2010 World Championship
Lefevre vs Aigner - 2010 World Championship heats
2014 C-1 World Cup

Artificial whitewater courses
Sports venues in Ljubljana
Šmarna Gora District